Chinese Farm may refer to:

 The Chinese Farm, an Egyptian agricultural facility and the location of the Battle of the Chinese Farm during the Yom Kippur War
 Chinese Farm (board game), a board game based upon the battle

See also 
 Chinese farmer (disambiguation)